Dungloe railway station was located north of Lough Meela, about 5 km from the town of Dungloe in County Donegal, Ireland.

The station opened on 9 March 1903 when the Londonderry and Lough Swilly Railway opened their Letterkenny and Burtonport Extension Railway, from Letterkenny to Burtonport. It closed on 3 June 1940 when the LLSR closed the line from Tooban Junction to Burtonport in an effort to save money.

Routes

References

Disused railway stations in County Donegal
Railway stations opened in 1903
Railway stations closed in 1940
1903 establishments in Ireland
1940 disestablishments in Ireland
Railway stations in the Republic of Ireland opened in the 20th century